The 1982–83 season was Burnley's first season in the second tier of English football. They were initially managed by Brian Miller in his third season in charge of the club until January 1983, when he was replaced by Frank Casper as caretaker manager until the end of the season.

Appearances and goals

|}

Matches

Football League Division Two
Key

In Result column, Burnley's score shown first
H = Home match
A = Away match

pen. = Penalty kick
o.g. = Own goal

Results

Final league position

FA Cup

League Cup

References

Burnley F.C. seasons
Burnley